The Communist Party of Tajikistan (Hizbi Kommunistiyi Tojikiston) is a communist party in Tajikistan, and the oldest political party in the country. The party was founded on 6 January 1924 and was the ruling party of the Tajik Autonomous Soviet Socialist Republic from 1924 to 1929 and the Tajik Soviet Socialist Republic from 1929 to 1990 as part of the Soviet Union as a republican branch of the Communist Party of the Soviet Union. It was banned in 1991 following the 1991 coup.

The CPT is a based on the concept of democratic centralism, a principle conceived by Russian Marxist Vladimir Lenin, that entails democratic and open discussion of policy issues within the party followed by the requirement of total unity in upholding the agreed policies. The highest institution of the party was the Party Congress, which elects the Central Committee. In between party congresses, the Central Committee is the highest decision-making organ regarding party affairs. After a party congress, the Central Committee elects the Politburo, as well as the First Secretary, the highest party officer. In between sessions of the Central Committee, the Politburo is the highest decision-making body.

The party is committed to communism and participates in the International Meeting of Communist and Workers' Parties, an annual international forum of communist parties. According to the party statute, the party adheres to Marxism–Leninism, based on the writings of Vladimir Lenin and Karl Marx, and formalized under Joseph Stalin. The party had pursued state socialism, under which all industries were nationalized and a command economy was introduced. Prior to the adoption of central planning in 1929, Lenin had introduced a mixed economy, commonly referred to as the New Economic Policy, in the 1920s, which allowed to introduce certain capitalist elements in the Soviet economy. This changed upon the ascension of Mikhail Gorbachev in 1985 when he and his allies envisioned the introduction of an economy similar to Lenin's earlier New Economic Policy through a program of "perestroika", or restructuring, but their reforms, leading to the unraveling of the CPT in the 1990 Dushanbe riots, the banning of the CPT in 1991 and the dissolution of the Soviet Union. The party managed to remain in power until 2000 when it was overtaken by the People's Democratic Party of Tajikistan but the party improved when it won 13.97% of the popular vote and 4 out of 63 seats in the 2005 election.

Today, the party is affiliated to the Union of Communist Parties – Communist Party of the Soviet Union.

History

Soviet era
The first social democratic groups arose in Tajikistan during the 1905 Russian Revolution and by late 1917 and early 1918, Bolshevik organizations were created in Khodjent, Ura-Tyube, Penjikent, and Shurab. On December 6, 1924, the government formed the Organizing Bureau of the Central Committee of the Communist Party of Uzbekistan in the Tajik Autonomous Soviet Socialist Republic. The first Tajik party conference was held between October 21–27, 1927. On 25 November 1929, by the decision of the Politburo of the CPSU, the CPT was formed by separation from the CPU. In 1975, the CPT had more than 94,000 members.

Regional and city committees
Dushanbe City Committee
Garm Regional Committee
Gorno-Badakhshan Regional Committee *Kulyab Regional Committee
Kurgan-Tyubinsk Regional Committee *Stalinabad Regional Committee
Ura-Tyuba Regional Committee

Post-independence
After becoming independent, it was voted to rename the CPT the Socialist Party of Tajikistan, however, by December 1991, the ban on the activities of the Communist Party was lifted. During the Tajikistani Civil War, the CPT supported the government and the Popular Front of Tajikistan. At present, the Communist Party of Tajikistan supports the government of Emomali Rahmon. Beginning in the 2000s, the CPT lost the majority of its electorate, with today's electorate of the party being made up mainly of people of retirement age.

Leaders

First Secretary of the Communist Party of Tajikistan (1924–1991)

Second Secretaries 
 Shirinsho Shotemur (1930–1932)
Ibrahim Ismailov (1932–1934)
 Saifullo Abdulloev (1936–1937)
 Petru Lucinschi (1986–1989)

Chairman of the Communist Party of Tajikistan (1991–Present)

Electoral history

Presidential elections

Assembly of Representatives elections

See also

First Secretary of the Communist Party of Tajikistan

References

 
1924 establishments in the Soviet Union
Tajikistan
Communism in Tajikistan
Tajikistan
Tajikistan
Political parties in Tajikistan
Political parties with year of establishment missing
Tajikistan
International Meeting of Communist and Workers Parties